Stuck on You! is a 1982 American comedy film directed by Lloyd Kaufman and Michael Herz of Troma Entertainment and starring Irwin Corey, Virginia Penta, Mark Mikulski, Albert Pia, and Norma Pratt.

Stuck on You! was the third in a series of four "sexy comedies" that helped establish Troma, beginning with 1979's Squeeze Play!, 1981's Waitress!, and followed by 1983's The First Turn-On!

Lloyd Kaufman has stated that Stuck on You! is his favorite of Troma's "sexy comedies".

Plot
The film, supposedly inspired by the writings of Tom Lehrer and Stan Freberg, follows 
estranged couple Bill and Carol, who are in a palimony suit against each other.  The zany Judge Gabriel (played by Professor Irwin Corey) is handling their suit. As Bill and Carol relate their problems to Gabriel, he demonstrates how all lovers from the beginning of time, including Adam and Eve, Queen Isabella and Christopher Columbus, and King Arthur and Lady Guinevere have all faced their exact same troubles.  The judge is finally revealed to be the angel Gabriel, sent down in hopes of bringing the couple back together.

Reception
Troma claimed that the film had grossed $9.6 million in the United States in its first 90 days of release.

References

External links

1982 films
1980s sex comedy films
American sex comedy films
American sexploitation films
1980s English-language films
Films directed by Lloyd Kaufman
Troma Entertainment films
Teen sex comedy films
1982 comedy films
1980s American films